Bradley Wayne Dalgarno (born August 11, 1967) is a Canadian former professional ice hockey right wing. He was drafted in the first round, sixth overall, by the New York Islanders of the National Hockey League (NHL) in the 1985 NHL Entry Draft.

Born in Vancouver, British Columbia and raised in Whitby, Ontario, Dalgarno played three seasons of junior hockey in the Ontario Hockey League with the Hamilton Steelhawks. He spent his entire professional career in the Islander organization. In his NHL career, he appeared in 321 games.  He scored 49 goals and added 71 assists. He appeared in 27 playoff games, scoring two goals and recording four assists.

Brad Dalgarno had to sit out the entire 1989-1990 season because of injuries he received in a fight against Joey Kocur. Dalgarno had a broken orbital bone, cheek bone, jaw, and also had a concussion.

Career statistics

External links

1967 births
Living people
Canadian ice hockey right wingers
Capital District Islanders players
Hamilton Steelhawks players
Ice hockey people from Ontario
National Hockey League first-round draft picks
New York Islanders draft picks
New York Islanders players
Sportspeople from Whitby, Ontario
Ice hockey people from Vancouver
Springfield Indians players